Damon Lusk (born September 18, 1977) is an American professional stock car racing driver. He primarily competed in the ARCA Re/Max Series, where he scored two wins in 53 starts between 2000 and 2009. In addition, he ran part-time in the NASCAR Busch Series for six years (each year from 1999 to 2005 excluding 2000). This most notably included his 2003 campaign, when he left ARCA to focus on competing in the Busch Series, where he ran eleven races for Tommy Baldwin Racing.

Racing career
Lusk entered NASCAR in 1997, competing in 28 NASCAR Northwest Series events from that year until 1999. He had the exact same stats in his 21 starts across two seasons with zero wins (1998 and 1999) in the NASCAR Southwest Series, but also won one pole position. After his three Northwest starts in 1999, specifically when he qualified his AOL/Kleenex No. 22 Chevy on the outside pole at Portland Speedway, he caught the eye of NASCAR Winston Cup Series driver Jimmy Spencer, who invited Lusk to drive his No. 12 Chevy in the Busch Series at Pikes Peak. He started dead last, but was able to improve enough to complete all but 8 laps, and finished the race in 34th position.

In 2001, Lusk made his first Truck Series start. He drove the No. 37 BayPak Ford for Derrike Cope's Quest Motor Racing team at Texas Motor Speedway. He had an impressive debut, starting 21st and finishing 11th. This was the only race he ran in that truck.

In 2002, Lusk was contacted by Tommy Baldwin Jr., a Winston Cup Series crew chief who wanted to form his own Busch Series team. Baldwin had driver Wally Dallenbach Jr. in for a few races. Lusk brought sponsorship from the West Virginia Department of Tourism to the No. 6 for the race at Richmond in September of that year. After qualifying 25th, Lusk was involved in an early wreck and finished 42nd. His next start came at Atlanta Motor Speedway, where Lusk started last on the grid but was able to drive through the field and finish 22nd in the race. In 2003, Sta-Rite agreed to a 10-race deal with Baldwin's team. This part-time schedule began at the season-opener at Daytona, where Lusk improved on his career best finish with a 21st. He was 22nd two weeks later at Las Vegas. At Texas Motor Speedway, Lusk was involved in a first-lap crash, relegating 43rd. For the rest of 2003, Lusk had a solid season. He was 18th at Loudon. He was 12th at Michigan. Despite being a rookie, he only wrecked twice, and ended the season with an average finish was 25.5.

Lusk signed with BACE Motorsports to drive the No. 74 Outdoor Channel Chevy full-time and for rookie of the year in the Busch Series in 2004. He also joined the team for the 2003 series finale at Homestead-Miami to prepare for the following year. In that race, Lusk drove the team's No. 33 car, finishing 18th. In his first three starts in 2004 with the team, Lusk finished 21st at Daytona, 24th at Rockingham and 25th at Darlington. However, that was not good enough for BACE, who was trying to keep their team afloat due to struggling to find sponsorship for Lusk. As a result, Lusk was released and replaced by Tony Raines (who had driven for BACE when they had a team in the Cup Series in 2003) for the rest of the season.

In 2004, Lusk was scheduled to run two races (the second races at Fontana and Charlotte) in the Nextel Cup Series, driving the SWAT Fitness Racing No. 62 Chevrolet (owned by Larry Hollenbeck), but he withdrew from both events.

In 2005, Lusk was hired by Dan Kinney's Premier Motorsports team, and planned to drive the No. 85 House Hunter Chevrolet for 20 races. However, the team was greatly underfunded, and failing to qualify for his first three races in the car, he was replaced by John Hayden (although Lusk returned to attempt one more race in July, failing to qualify for that one as well). In ARCA that year, he joined Vision Racing to drive their No. 37 at Pocono, Gateway, and Michigan.

In 2006, Lusk started the season in the No. 37 again, but after the season-opening race at Daytona, he moved to Brack Maggard Racing's No. 65 Dodge, where he was scheduled to run full-time for the rest of the season. However, he left the team during the year for a Truck Series ride with Woodard Racing in the last five races of the season, replacing Boston Reid. Lusk earned a best finish of 17th at Atlanta Motor Speedway and finished 41st in points. Also, he returned to the Cup Series and was scheduled to compete in the second Pocono race in No. 64 Chevrolet for Premier, but he withdrew again.

In 2007, Lusk was scheduled to run part-time in the Nextel Cup Series in James Hylton's No. 58 Chevrolet, but the team did not attempt any races after failing to qualify for that year's Daytona 500 with Hylton driving. Although Lusk did not attempt to qualify for any Cup Series races in 2007, he did compete for in ARCA's season-opener at Daytona and at the Michigan ARCA 200 that year for Les Barnart's team. At Michigan, they ran the No. 25 instead of their usual No. 55 in order to use owner points from Venturini Motorsports. After making no starts in ARCA or NASCAR in 2008, Lusk returned to ARCA in 2009 for two races in the Hendren Motorsports No. 66 Ford at the dirt tracks of Springfield and DuQuoin, which would end up being his final stock car starts.

Motorsports career results

NASCAR
(key) (Bold – Pole position awarded by qualifying time. Italics – Pole position earned by points standings or practice time. * – Most laps led.)

Busch Series

Craftsman Truck Series

ARCA Racing Series
(key) (Bold – Pole position awarded by qualifying time. Italics – Pole position earned by points standings or practice time. * – Most laps led.)

References

External links
 

Living people
1977 births
People from Kennewick, Washington
Racing drivers from Washington (state)
NASCAR drivers
ARCA Menards Series drivers